Serjuče is a small settlement north of Moravče in central Slovenia. The area is part of the traditional region of Upper Carniola. It is now included with the rest of the Municipality of Moravče in the Central Slovenia Statistical Region.

References

External links
 
Serjuče on Geopedia

Populated places in the Municipality of Moravče